Alix is a surname. Notable people with the surname include:

 Adolfo Alix Jr. (born 1978), Filipino screenwriter
 Anthony Alix (born 1986), professional Canadian football placekicker and punter for the BC Lions
 Franklin DeWayne Alix (1975–2010), American serial killer
 Gabriel Alix (1930–1998), Haitian painter
 May Alix (1902–1983), American jazz vocalist
 Pierre-Michel Alix (1762–1817), French engraver
 Alberto García-Alix (1956-) Spanish photographer of La Movida Madrileña
 Antonio García-Alix (1852–1911), Spanish Attorney and Politician, Minister for Public Instruction and Fine Arts, then for Finance, Government.
 José Alix-Alix (1912–1988), Spanish Physician, specializing in Tuberculosis therapy from the pre-antibiotic era, pioneer of Thoracic Surgery.